Ray Brown (born August 11, 1961) is a retired American middle-distance runner who competed primarily in the 800 meters. An indoor specialist, he represented his country at four consecutive World Indoor Championships starting in 1987 and made the final once, in 1989. In addition, he is a four-time national indoor champion.

International competitions

Personal bests
Outdoor
800 metres – 1:45.11 (Bern 1989)
1000 metres – 2:18.96 (Gateshead 1986)
Indoor
800 metres – 1:46.06 (Piraeus 1989)
1000 metres – 2:19.20 (East Rutherford 1988)

References

All-Athletics profile

1961 births
Living people
American male middle-distance runners